Nepal Television, shortened to NTV is the Nepalese national public state-controlled television broadcaster. It is the oldest and most watched television channel in Nepal. The news broadcast at 8:00 PM is the channel's most popular show, followed by comedy programmes such as Sakkigoni, Mundre Ko Comedy Club and Meri Bassai.

It also has four sister channels, NTV PLUS, NTV News, NTV Kohalpur and NTV Itahari, all owned by the Nepalese government. The network started broadcasting in HD from 31 January 2019.

Several attempts are being made by media stakeholders to convert and transform NTV into a truly Public Service Broadcasting (PSB) entity. NTV, being currently owned by the government, has lost its editorial independence and is blamed for continuously being a government mouthpiece. As the country's oldest television channel, a need for transforming its operation into the hands of the public is realized by media experts in Nepal. Mr. Nir Shah was the first chairman.

Former shows on NTV

 Yestai Hunchha (First television drama of Nepal, directed by Ujwal Ghimire)
 Aayam
 Abhibyakti
 Biswo Ghatna
 Chintan Manan/ Manthan
 Hamro Gaun Ramro Gaun
 Hijo Aaj Ka Kura
 Bhid Sekhi Bhid Samma( Directed by Badri adhikari)
 Hostel
 Khel Khel
 Hatterika
 Tadha ko Basti (Directed by Krishna Malla)
 Mayos Super Challenge
 Nagad Panch Lakh
 Nepali Tara
 Sanibar Vijay Kumar Sanga
 Tito Satya
 Twakka Tukka
 Chakrabyuha 
 Raap 
 Yuga Dekhi Yuga Samma
 8 Baje Talk Show Vijay Kumar Pandey

Current shows on NTV

Comedy
 Bhadragol
 Chaleko Chalan
 Cheu Na Tuppo
 Gup Chup
 Hakka Hakki
 Jai Hosh
 Jire Khursani
 Madan bahadur Hari bahadur 4
 Maha Jodi
 Meri Bassai
 Sishnu Pani
 Tato Na Saro
 Tato Piro
 Virus
 Ke Jamana Aa

Nepali Tele Film
Jiwan Chakra

Drama 
 Aphanta
 Guthi
 Santan
 Sunaulo Sansar
 Yatra Jindagi Ko

Game shows
 Chham Chhami
 Magical Thumb: A Live Game Show
 Pratibhako Aagan
 Quiz Mania Worldwide by Wai Wai
 Singing Icon Nepal
 The Singing Star

Kids 
 Baal Shanti Abhiyaan 
 Moomin
 Nature Calls
 Opening Children Programme
 Perman
 Motu Patlu
 Doraemon

News 
 Gunte bhai
 Maile timilai kute
 NTV Peace Forum
 Samachar (समाचार)
 Sero Phero

Miscellaneous
 Miss Nepal
 Artha Ko Artha
 Krishi Karyakram(Agriculture Program)
 Mero Ghar Mero Sansar
 Swasthya Charcha

Broadcasting hours 
Nepal Television broadcasts for 24 hours daily.

References

External links
 Nepal Television official website
 NTV Live

Television channels in Nepal
Television channels and stations established in 1983
Government agencies of Nepal
1984 establishments in Nepal
State media